The 1962 John Carroll Blue Streaks football team was an American football team that represented John Carroll University in the Presidents' Athletic Conference (PAC) during the 1962 NCAA College Division football season. The team compiled a 7–0 record, won the PAC championship, and outscored opponents by a total of 211 to 20.  

John Ray was the team's head coach for the fourth year. His assistant coaches included backfield coach Bill Dando and line coach Dave Hurd.

The team set four national defensive records, including holding opponents to (a) an average of minus one yard per game in rushing, (b) an average of one yard per offensive play, minus 0.32 yards per rush.

Schedule

References

John Carroll
John Carroll Blue Streaks football seasons
College football undefeated seasons
John Carroll Blue Streaks football